Claudelands Bridge is a dual-lane truss road bridge over the Waikato River, joining Claudelands with Hamilton Central. In 1968 it was converted from the old railway bridge, which had been completed about the end of July 1883. The road bridge was given a Category 2 listing in 1985.

Around 11,000 vehicles a day use the bridge. The bridge is the second busiest CBD route for cyclists, with 135 in peak hours in 2009 and a rising trend. To make the bridge safer for the 600 cyclists a day, sharrows are being added to the lane markings in 2019. Buses to Rototuna and route 11 cross the bridge.

A new railway bridge, opened on 19 September 1964, a few metres downstream, replaced the old with a 7-span,  pre-stressed concrete box girder bridge. The spans are supported by reinforced concrete piers, resting on in-situ cast piles. It was the first bridge in the country to be stressed with a 100-ton Freyssinet cable.

Old railway bridge history 

The bridge was designed in 1880 and the £5,519 contract let on 3 November 1881 to W. Sims. Although Sir George Grey turned the first sod of the railway extension at Claudelands in 1879, there seems to have been little publicity for that or the bridge, with only minimal mention in 1883. Ironwork for the bridge was reported as shipped in 1881.

Progress was very slow, so the contract was re-let to J. R. Stone on 18 September 1882 for £4,312 13s 6d, plus the £1,376 cost (the £5,688 total would now be equivalent to just under $1m) of the four cast cylinders from A & G Price. The bridge was completed on 21 September 1883 and used for construction trains, until the Hamilton-Morrinsville railway opened on 1 October 1884.

It was originally tested with a 117-ton load. To cope with greater loads, an extra cylinder was added to the original two on each side of the main channel, the 2 new cylinders being ordered from S Luke & Co for £2,354 in 1906, and the new deck from A & T Burt Ltd for £5,872 in 1907. Further strengthening was designed in 1934 to cope with the 135-ton K-Class locomotives.

There was pressure for a footbridge from before the railway was opened, See also a newspaper report from 1893.

A commission was appointed to investigate in 1906. With the widening and strengthening of the bridge, it was possible to build a footbridge in 1908, though there were complaints about the lack of lighting and cycling was banned. The footbridge was renewed in 1936.

There was soon also pressure to remove the railway from the centre of the CBD. In 1912 the Borough Council suggested the line could be lowered. A 1938 plan was stopped by war in 1939. The National Roads Board then promoted it and, in September 1959, the Ministry of Works started the scheme to put the railway in a tunnel and replace the old bridge with one at the tunnel level.

Utilities 
From 1970 to 1974 33kV cables were laid across the bridge. Further wiring was done in 1988.

References

External links 

Photos –
 1890s
 1908 widening
 1909 footbridge
 1920s train on bridge
 1930 aerial photo of river and bridge
 1947 aerial photo of river and bridge
 1955 aerial photo of bridge and Hamilton station
1882-1984 Hamilton City Libraries photos of railway bridge
 1961 pontoons in place for new bridge
 1963 new bridge
 1960s Claudelands Rd construction
 1964-9 new and old bridges
 1972 road and rail bridges
 Google street view

Bridges completed in 1883
Buildings and structures completed in 1964
Heritage New Zealand Category 2 historic places in Waikato
Buildings and structures in Hamilton, New Zealand
Rail transport in Waikato
Railway bridges in New Zealand
Steel bridges in New Zealand
Bridges in Waikato
Bridges over the Waikato River